In the Labyrinth (French: Dans le labyrinthe) was a groundbreaking multi-screen presentation at the Labyrinth pavilion at Expo 67 in Montreal, Quebec, Canada. It used 35 mm and 70 mm film projected simultaneously on multiple screens and was the precursor of today's IMAX format.

History

Roman Kroitor created a six-screen exhibit to show National Film Board of Canada at the Canadian National Exhibition in 1963. He later proposed creating a screen that had a display with the maximum horizontal and vertical fields of vision, but was unable to gain financial backing until the NFB got a spot at He later proposed a Expo 67. He created Faces to show how his idea would work and it utilized two screens.

Kroitor, Low, and Hugh O'Connor started working on the project in January 1964, with Tom Daly executive producing. Northrop Frye was brought in to aid in planning the scenario and suggested seven psychological steps of initiation (origins, childhood, confident, youth, the desert, the battle with the dragon, death, and ascent or celebration through death). Low was committed to In the Labyrinth and declined an offer to work on 2001: A Space Odyssey. NFB animator Ryan Larkin also designed animated sequences for the film.

Scenes for the exhibition were filmed in the United Kingdom, United States, Ethiopia, Japan, Cambodia, Greece, India, Soviet Union, Canada, and India. The project cost $4.5 million. The first room included eight balconies, five theatre sound systems, and 288 speakers. The second room was a M-shaped maze with disorienting elements. The third room had five screens in the form of a cruciform that was 9m x 13m. The pavilion was attended by 1.3 million people in 1967, and ran for 5,545 shows for six months.

In the Labyrinth was re-issued in a single-screen format in 1979. In May 2007, the NFB and the Cinémathèque québécoise presented an exhibition on the Labyrinth pavilion, marking the 40th anniversary of Expo 67. From September 18 to 30, 2017, during the 50th anniversary of Expo 67, the central square of Place des Arts was the site of a multi-screen NFB installation Expo 67 Live, partly inspired by In the Labyrinth.

Reception
The New York Times stated that In the Labyrinth was "as special to Expo 67 as the Eiffel Tower was to the Paris Exposition of 1889", and Film Quarterly stated that it was "the most ambitious architectural-film relationship of all".

Legacy
Observers from Japan, the host of Expo '70, were sent to see In the Labyrinth and Low was invited to advise. Kroitor and Donald Brittain, as producer and director respectively, created a film for the event. Kroitor, Graeme Ferguson, Robert Kerr, and William Shaw worked on a camera and projector system through their company IMAX Corporation. Tiger Child was completed after two years of development and they started selling the screens.

It inspired Canadian filmmaker Norman Jewison to apply similar techniques to his film The Thomas Crown Affair.

References

Works cited

External links
 
 
 Web page for Labyrinth and film
 Labyrinth pavilion

National Film Board of Canada short films
Canadian avant-garde and experimental short films
Expo 67
Canadian black-and-white films
Films directed by Colin Low (filmmaker)
World's fair films
Multi-screen film
IMAX
Films scored by Eldon Rathburn
Films produced by Tom Daly
Films directed by Roman Kroitor
1967 films
1960s Canadian films